Chae Song-oh (born 22 March 1989) is a South Korean fencer. She won one of the bronze medals in the women's team foil event at the 2018 Asian Games held in Jakarta, Indonesia.

In 2019, she won the silver medal in the women's team foil event at the Asian Fencing Championships held in Chiba, Japan. She also competed in the women's foil event at the 2019 World Fencing Championships held in Budapest, Hungary without winning a medal. She was eliminated in her first match by Anne Sauer of Germany.

She competed at the 2022 World Fencing Championships held in Cairo, Egypt.

References

External links 
 

Living people
1989 births
Place of birth missing (living people)
South Korean female fencers
South Korean foil fencers
Asian Games medalists in fencing
Asian Games bronze medalists for South Korea
Fencers at the 2018 Asian Games
Medalists at the 2018 Asian Games
21st-century South Korean women